Tour of Cartier (officially the Tour of Cartier – East Mediterrannean Cycling Prohect) is a stage road cycling race held annually in Turkey since 2018. It is part of UCI Europe Tour in category 2.2. It is organized by the Cartier Tour travel agency, which also organizes the Grand Prix Side and the Grand Prix Alanya.

Winners

References

Cycle races in Turkey
UCI Europe Tour races
Recurring sporting events established in 2018